Chris Gehringer (born May 27, 1962) is an American mastering engineer, known for having mastered recordings such as Gwen Stefani's Love. Angel. Music. Baby. (2004), Rihanna's Loud (2010), Lady Gaga's Born This Way (2011) and Drake's Take Care (2011).

Biography
Gehringer was born in Teaneck, New Jersey and raised in Bergen County. After graduating from Pascack Hills High School in Montvale, New Jersey, he attended the Institute of Audio Research. His first job in the industry was at Greene Street Recording and from there, he went on to work as a cutting assistant at Trutone Records. 

In 1985, Gehringer joined Tom Coyne and Herbie Powers at Frankford-Wayne Mastering and mastered primarily dance and R&B records throughout the 1980s. 

In 1988, he moved to the Hit Factory and in his 12 years there, mastered many landmark releases in Rap and Hip-Hop, including records by Naughty By Nature, Mobb Deep, Wu Tang Clan and PM Dawn. 

In 2000, he joined Sterling Sound as a senior mastering engineer and in 2016, Gehringer became a partner at Sterling Sound.

Awards and nominations 
Grammy Awards

|-
|rowspan="2"| 2012
|Loud
|rowspan="2"| Album of the Year
|
|-
|Born This Way
|
|-
|rowspan="3"|2013
|"Stronger (What Doesn't Kill You)"
| rowspan="2"| Record of the Year
|
|-
|"We Are Young"
|
|-
|Some Nights
|Album of the Year
|
|-
|2014
|"Blurred Lines"
|rowspan="3"| Record of the Year
|
|-
|2016
|"Work"
|
|-
|2016
|"Stressed Out"
|
|-
|rowspan="2"| 2019
|Dirty Computer
|Album of the Year
|
|-
|Head Over Heels
|Best Engineered Album, Non-Classical
|
|-
|rowspan="3"| 2020
|"Truth Hurts"
|Record of the Year
|
|-
|Norman Fucking Rockwell!
|rowspan="3"| Album of the Year
|
|-
|Cuz I Love You
|
|-
| rowspan="2"| 2021
| Future Nostalgia
| 
|-
| "Don't Start Now"
| rowspan="2"| Record of the Year
| 
|-
| rowspan="2"| 2022
| "Montero (Call Me by Your Name)"
| 
|-
| Montero
|Album of the Year
| 
|-

Latin Grammy Awards

|-
|2012
|Peligro
|Album of the Year
|
|-

TEC Awards

|-
|2011
|"F***k You"
|Record Production/Single
|
|-

Selected works
A list of music Gehringer has mastered includes:
 50 Cent: Thug Love (1999)
 AJR: Neotheater (2019)
 Avril Lavigne Love Sux (2022)
 Cardi B: Be Careful (2018)
 Chiiild: Synthetic Soul (2020)
 Chromeo: Head over Heels (2018)
 Demi Lovato: Tell Me You Love Me (2017) 
 Drake: Thank Me Later (2010)
 Dua Lipa: Future Nostalgia (2020)
 Harry Styles: Harry Styles (2017)
 Janelle Monáe: Dirty Computer (2018)
Jason Mraz: We Sing. We Dance. We Steal Things. (2008)
Lady Gaga: Born This Way (2011)
Kelly Clarkson: Stronger (2011)
Lana Del Rey: Norman Fucking Rockwell! (2019)
Leon Bridges: Good Thing (2018)
Lil Tecca: We Love You Tecca (2019)
Lizzo: Cuz I Love You (2019)
Mike Posner: Keep Going (2019)
Nas: The Lost Tapes 2 (2019)
Nas: Stillmatic (2001)
Naughty by Nature: Naughty by Nature (1991)
Original soundtrack: Boomerang (1992)
Rihanna: Anti (2016)
Rihanna: Loud (2010)
Rihanna: Unapologetic (2012)
Selena Gomez: Rare (2020)
Shaggy: Hot Shot (2000)
St. Vincent: Masseduction (2017)
Twenty One Pilots: Trench (2018)
Wu-Tang Clan: Enter the Wu-Tang (36 Chambers) (1993)
 Edyta Gorniak: Your High (2014)

References

Living people
1962 births
American audio engineers
Latin Grammy Award winners